Tye Kayle Sheridan (born November 11, 1996) is an American actor and producer. He is best known for playing the young Scott Summers / Cyclops in the reboot X-Men film series (2016–2019), as well as Wade Watts in Ready Player One (2018) and Ben Goudy in Scouts Guide to the Zombie Apocalypse (2015). Sheridan made his feature film debut in Terrence Malick's experimental drama film The Tree of Life (2011) and had his first leading role in Jeff Nichols's film Mud (2012). He also co-starred in David Gordon Green's drama Joe (2013) and the period thriller The Stanford Prison Experiment (2015). In 2020, he co-founded AI production tools company Wonder Dynamics with visual effects artist Nikola Todorovic.

Early life
Sheridan was born in Palestine, Texas. His mother, Stephanie (Wright) Sheridan, owns a beauty salon, and his father, Bryan Sheridan, is a driver for UPS. He has a younger sister, Madison. He was enrolled in the Elkhart Independent School District until his film career became a priority focus when he was 16 years old, and he received tutoring on film sets.

Career

Sheridan made his feature film debut in the Terrence Malick art film The Tree of Life (2011), with Brad Pitt, Jessica Chastain, and Sean Penn, after an almost year-long casting search involving more than 10,000 children from Texas and Oklahoma. The film premiered at the 2011 Cannes Film Festival, and went on to be awarded the Palme d'Or and nominated for the Academy Award for Best Picture.

In 2012, he played the leading role of Ellis in Jeff Nichols' Mud opposite Jacob Lofland and Matthew McConaughey. The coming-of-age drama-thriller film premiered at the 2012 Cannes Film Festival and Sheridan received a Critics' Choice Award nomination.

Sheridan played Gary Jones in the film Joe, which stars Nicolas Cage playing an ex-con who meets a 15-year-old boy, the eldest child in a homeless family headed by an alcoholic father, and is faced with the choice of redemption or ruin. For his role he received the Marcello Mastroianni Award for best upcoming young actor at the 70th Venice International Film Festival.

In 2015, Sheridan starred in the three films that premiered at the Sundance Film Festival. He co-starred opposite Gregg Turkington and Michael Cera in the drama Entertainment, played a prisoner in the film adaptation of The Stanford Prison Experiment, and appeared in Rodrigo Garcia's drama Last Days in the Desert opposite Ewan McGregor, released May 2016. That year, he also had a supporting role in the film adaptation of Gillian Flynn's Dark Places and the leading role in the horror comedy Scouts Guide to the Zombie Apocalypse.

Sheridan played the mutant Scott Summers/Cyclops in the film X-Men: Apocalypse (2016), released on May 27, 2016.

In 2017, Sheridan starred in the war drama The Yellow Birds (2017), opposite Alden Ehrenreich, Jack Huston, and Jennifer Aniston. Also that year, Sheridan co-starred with Kaitlyn Dever in Grass Stains, a film written and directed by Kyle Wilamowski.

In 2018, Sheridan played Wade Watts, a.k.a. Parzival, the lead character, in Steven Spielberg's science fiction blockbuster film Ready Player One. He then reprised the role of Scott Summers/Cyclops in the 2019 film Dark Phoenix.

In 2020, Sheridan took a voice role in the "Face of the Franchise" mode of Madden NFL 21.

In 2021, Sheridan co-starred in the Neil Burger sci-fi thriller Voyagers (2021) with Colin Farrell, Lily-Rose Depp, Isaac Hempstead Wright, and Fionn Whitehead.

Filmography

Film

Television

Video games

Awards and nominations

References

External links
 

1996 births
American male child actors
Living people
People from Anderson County, Texas
Male actors from Texas
American male film actors
American male voice actors
21st-century American male actors
Marcello Mastroianni Award winners